Elman Sultanov (born 6 May 1974) is a Azerbaijani-Israeli-Ukrainian retired professional footballer and current Reserve team coach for Sabail FK.

National team statistics

External links

 
 

1974 births
Living people
Israeli footballers
Azerbaijani footballers
FC Krystal Kherson players
FC Vorskla Poltava players
FC Torpedo Zaporizhzhia players
Neftçi PFK players
MOIK Baku players
FC Baku players
Hapoel Tzafririm Holon F.C. players
FK Žalgiris players
Qarabağ FK players
Simurq PIK players
Ukrainian Premier League players
Ukrainian First League players
Ukrainian Second League players
Israeli Premier League players
A Lyga players
Azerbaijan international footballers
Association football midfielders
Azerbaijani expatriate footballers
Expatriate footballers in Ukraine
Azerbaijani expatriate sportspeople in Ukraine
Expatriate footballers in Lithuania
Azerbaijani expatriate sportspeople in Lithuania